Miroslava Milenović (born 11 June 1963) is a Serbian economist and forensic accountant. She also was a member of the Anti-Corruption Council of Serbia from 2012 until her resignation in 2016.

Early life and education
Born in on 11 June 1963, she graduated from the Faculty of Economics, University of Belgrade in 1984. In 2004, she received a certificate of certified specialist in the fight against terrorism and organized crime, at the Faculty of Political Sciences, University of Belgrade.

Career
In 2002, she served as the special adviser of the Minister of Finance Božidar Đelić, mainly in the department for the restructuring of public enterprises.

From 2007, she worked as an expert of the Attorney of Serbia with the recommendation of the United States Department of Justice.

From 2012, she was a member of the Anti-Corruption Council of Serbia. In 2013, she served as the special adviser of the Minister of Economy Saša Radulović.

She was named the 2015 Person of the Year by the OSCE Mission to Serbia, for her contribution to the fight against corruption and for the promotion of freedom of the media.

Following her resignation on the position in the Anti-Corruption Council of Serbia, she joined the political party Enough is Enough in 2016 and became the vice president of the party.

References

External links
 Miroslava Milenović 
 Miroslava Milenović, jedina finansijska forenzičarka u Srbiji 
 

1963 births
Living people
Accountants
Serbian economists
Serbian politicians
University of Belgrade alumni